Hasan Yeşilbudak (born 11 January 1984) is a Turkish male volleyball player. He is part of the Turkey men's national volleyball team. On club level he played for Halkbank Ankara.

Sporting achievements

Clubs

National championships
 2015/2016  Turkish SuperCup 2015, with Halkbank Ankara
 2015/2016  Turkish Championship, with Halkbank Ankara

References

External links
 Hasan Yeşilbudak at the International Volleyball Federation
 

1984 births
Living people
Turkish men's volleyball players
Place of birth missing (living people)
Halkbank volleyball players
21st-century Turkish people